Here is a list of all singles released commercially and promotionally by recording duo Captain & Tennille, grouped by album.

Love Will Keep Us Together (1975)

"Love Will Keep Us Together"
FR 7" single (1975)  A&M 625 040
"Love Will Keep Us Together" – 3:15
"Gentle Stranger" – 3:26

UK 7" single (1975)  A&M AMS7165
"Love Will Keep Us Together" – 3:15
"Gentle Stranger" – 3:26

UK EP (??)  A&M AMEP1001
"Love Will Keep Us Together"
"Shop Around"
"The Way I Want to Touch You"
"Muskrat Love"

US 7" single (1975)  A&M 1672-S
"Love Will Keep Us Together" – 3:15
"Gentle Stranger" – 3:26

US 7" single (1975)  A&M 1715-S
"Por Amor Viviremos (Love Will Keep Us Together)" – 3:15
"Broddy Bounce" – 2:32

"Gentle Stranger"
CL 7" single (1975)  A&M 12044
"Gentle Stranger"
"Love Will Keep Us Together"

"The Way I Want to Touch You"
US 7" single (1975)  A&M 1725-S
"The Way I Want to Touch You" – 2:35
"Broddy Bounce" – 2:29

US 7" promo (1975)  A&M 1774
"Como Yo Quiero Sentirte (The Way I Want to Touch You)" (stereo) – 2:43
"Como Yo Quiero Sentirte (The Way I Want to Touch You)" (mono) – 2:43

Song of Joy (1976)

"Lonely Night (Angel Face)"
CA 7" single (1980)  A&M 1782
"Lonely Night (Angel Face)"
"Smile for Me One More Time" – 3:17

FR 7" single (1976)  A&M 625052
"Lonely Night (Angel Face)" – 3:17
"Smile for Me One More Time" – 3:17

GE 7" single (1976)  A&M 16 708
"Lonely Night (Angel Face)" – 3:17
"Smile for Me One More Time" – 3:17

NZ 7" single (1976)  A&M K6279
"Lonely Night (Angel Face)" – 3:17
"Smile for Me One More Time" – 3:17

UK 7" single (1976)  A&M AMS 7216
"Lonely Night (Angel Face)" – 3:17
"Smile for Me One More Time" – 3:17

US 7" single (1976)  A&M 1782-S
"Lonely Night (Angel Face)" – 3:17
"Smile for Me One More Time" – 3:17

US 7" single (1976)  A&M 8600
"Lonely Night (Angel Face)" – 3:17
"Shop Around" – 3:23

US 7" promo (1976)  A&M 1782
"Lonely Night (Angel Face)" (stereo) – 3:17
"Lonely Night (Angel Face)" (mono) – 3:17

"Shop Around"
AU 7" single (1976)  A&M K-6396
"Shop Around" – 3:23
"Butterscotch Castle" – 3:19

CA 7" single (1976)  A&M AM-1817-S
"Shop Around" – 3:23
"Butterscotch Castle" – 3:19

CA 7" promo (1976)  A&M AM-1817
"Shop Around" (stereo) – 3:23
"Shop Around" (mono) – 3:23

US 7" single (1976)  A&M 1817-S
"Shop Around" – 3:23
"Butterscotch Castle" – 3:19

US 7" promo (1976)  A&M 1817
"Shop Around" (stereo) – 3:23
"Shop Around" (mono) – 3:23

"Muskrat Love"
GE 7" single (1976)  Ariola 17 389 AT
"Muskrat Love" – 3:50
"Honey Come Love Me" – 2:56

US 7" single (1976)  A&M 1870-S
"Muskrat Love" – 3:50
"Honey Come Love Me" – 2:56

US 7" promo (1976)  A&M 1870
"Muskrat Love" (stereo) – 3:50
"Muskrat Love" (mono) – 3:50

"Mind Your Love"
CL 7" promo (1976)  A&M 1267
"Preocupate De Tu Amor (Mind Your Love)"
"Shop Around"

"Song of Joy"
AR 7" single (1976)  A&M DIF 092
"Cancion De Alegria (Song of Joy)"
"De Compras"
"Amor De Muskrat (Muskrat Love)" – 3:49
"1954 Boogie Blues" – 4:54

US 7" single (1976)  A&M 8601-S
"Song of Joy" – 3:14
"Wedding Song (There Is Love)"

Come In from the Rain (1977)

"Can't Stop Dancin'"
AU 7" single (1977)  A&M K-6746
"Can't Stop Dancin'"
"The Good Songs"

CA 7" promo (1977)  A&M 1912
"Can't Stop Dancin'" (stereo) – 3:18
"Can't Stop Dancin'" (mono) – 3:18

US 7" single (1977)  A&M 1912-S
"Can't Stop Dancin'" – 3:18
"Mis Canciones (The Good Songs)" – 3:43

US 7" promo (1977)  A&M 1912
"Can't Stop Dancin'" (stereo) – 3:18
"Can't Stop Dancin'" (mono) – 3:18

"Come In from the Rain"
CA 7" promo (1977)  A&M 1944
"Come In from the Rain" (stereo edit) – 3:30
"Come In from the Rain" (mono edit) – 3:30

US 7" single (1977)  A&M 1944-S
"Come In from the Rain" – 3:50
"We Never Really Say Goodbye" – 2:18

US 7" promo (1977)  A&M 1944
"Come In from the Rain" (stereo edit) – 3:30
"Come In from the Rain" (mono edit) – 3:30

"Circles"
US 7" single (1977)  A&M 1970-S
"Circles"
"1954 Boogie Blues"

US 7" promo (1977)  A&M 1970
"Circles" (stereo)
"Circles" (mono)

Dream (1978)

"I'm on My Way"
US 7" single (1978)  A&M AM2027
"I'm on My Way" – 2:42
"We Never Really Said Goodbye"

US 7" promo (1978)  A&M AM2027
"I'm on My Way" (stereo) – 2:42
"I'm on My Way" (mono) – 2:42

"You Never Done It Like That"
CA 7" promo (1978)  A&M 2063
"You Never Done It Like That" (stereo) – 3:19
"You Never Done It Like That" (mono) – 3:19

NE 7" single (1978)  A&M AMS6624
"You Never Done It Like That" – 3:19
"'D' Keyboard Blues" – 4:01

NE 7" single (1978)  A&M AMS 9004
"You Never Done It Like That" – 3:19
"'D' Keyboard Blues" – 4:01

UK 7" single (1978)  A&M AMS7384
"You Never Done It Like That" – 3:19
"'D' Keyboard Blues" – 4:01

US 7" single (1978)  A&M 2063-S
"You Never Done It Like That" – 3:19
"'D' Keyboard Blues" – 4:01

US 7" promo (1978)  A&M 2063
"You Never Done It Like That" (stereo) – 3:19
"You Never Done It Like That" (mono) – 3:19

"You Need a Woman Tonight"
NE 7" single (1979)  A&M AMS6875
"You Need a Woman Tonight" – 3:14
"Love Me Like a Baby" – 3:35

US 7" single (1979)  A&M 2106
"You Need a Woman Tonight" – 3:14
"Love Me Like a Baby" – 3:35

Make Your Move (1979)

"How Can You Be So Cold"
GE 7" single (1979)  Casablanca 6000 483
"How Can You Be So Cold" (pt. 1) – 3:40
"How Can You Be So Cold" (pt. 2) – 3:25

GE 12" single (1979)  Casablanca 6000 490
"How Can You Be So Cold" – 6:55
"Happy Together (A Fantasy)" – 4:28

"Do That to Me One More Time"
CA 7" single (1979)  Casablanca NB 2215
"Do That to Me One More Time" – 3:45
"Deep in the Dark" – 5:25

FR 7" single (1979)  Disques Vogue 101247
"Do That to Me One More Time" – 3:45
"Deep in the Dark" – 5:25

GE 7" single (1979)  Casablanca 6175 026
"Do That to Me One More Time" – 3:45
"Deep in the Dark" – 5:25

SP 7" single (1979)  Casablanca 61 75 026
"Do That to Me One More Time" – 3:45
"Deep in the Dark" – 5:25

SP 7" single (1980)  Casablanca 60 00 416
"Amame Una Vez Mas (Do That to Me One More Time)" – 4:05
"Deep in the Dark" – 5:25

UK 7" single (1979)  Casablanca CAN 175
"Do That to Me One More Time" – 3:45
"Deep in the Dark" – 5:25

US 7" single (1979)  Casablanca NB 2215
"Do That to Me One More Time" – 3:45
"Deep in the Dark" – 5:25

US 7" single (1979)  Casablanca 812-990-7
"Do That to Me One More Time" – 4:17
"Happy Together (A Fantasy)" – 4:30

US 7" single (1980)  Casablanca NB 2247
"Do That to Me One More Time" – 3:45
"Deep in the Dark" – 5:25

US 7" promo (1979)  Casablanca NB 2215 DJ
"Do That to Me One More Time" (stereo) – 3:45
"Do That to Me One More Time" (mono) – 3:45

"Baby You Still Got It"
FR 7" single (1980)  Casablanca 101308
"Baby You Still Got It"
"Love on a Shoestring" – 3:37

"No Love in the Morning"
UK 7" single (1979)  Casablanca CAN191
"No Love in the Morning" – 4:04
"How Can You Be So Cold"

UK 12" single (1980)  Casablanca CANL191
"No Love in the Morning" – 4:04
"Amame Una Vez Mas (Do That to Me One More Time)" – 4:02
"Happy Together (A Fantasy)" – 5:23

"Love on a Shoestring"
CA 7" single (1980)  Casablanca 2243
"Love on a Shoestring" – 3:37
"How Can You Be So Cold"

GE 7" single (1980)  Casablanca 6175 033
"Love on a Shoestring" – 3:37
"How Can You Be So Cold"

US 7" single (1980)  Casablanca NB 2243
"Love on a Shoestring" – 3:37
"How Can You Be So Cold"

US 7" promo (1980)  Casablanca NB 2243 DJ
"Love on a Shoestring" (stereo) – 3:37
"Love on a Shoestring" (mono) – 3:37

"Happy Together (A Fantasy)"
CA 7" single (1980)  Casablanca NB 2264
"Happy Together (A Fantasy)"
"Baby You Still Got It"

UK 12" single (1980)  Casablanca CANL200
"Happy Together" – 5:23
"No Love in the Morning" – 4:04
"Amame Una Vez Mas (Do That to Me One More Time)" – 4:02

US 7" single (1980)  Casablanca NB 2264
"Happy Together (A Fantasy)"
"Baby You Still Got It"

Keeping Our Love Warm (1980)

"This Is Not the First Time"
US 7" single (1980)  Casablanca 2320
"This Is Not the First Time"
"Gentle Stranger"

"Keepin' Our Love Warm"
EU 7" single (1980)  Casablanca 6000 606
"Keepin' Our Love Warm" – 2:53
"Until You Come Back to Me"

UK 7" single (1980)  Casablanca CAN 215
"Keepin' Our Love Warm" – 2:53
"Gentle Stranger"

US 7" single (1980)  Casablanca NB-2328
"Keepin' Our Love Warm" – 2:53
"Don't Forget Me"

US 7" promo (1980)  Casablanca NB-2328DJ
"Keepin' Our Love Warm" (stereo) – 2:53
"Keepin' Our Love Warm" (mono) – 2:53

"But I Think It's a Dream"
IT 7" promo (1980)  Casablanca DN 38432
"But I Think It's a Dream"
"Since I Fell for You"

Other singles

"The Way I Want to Touch You" (original issue)
US 7" single (1973)  Butterscotch Castle BC 001
"The Way I Want to Touch You" – 2:35
"Disney Girls" – 4:30

"Disney Girls"
US 7" single (1974)  Joyce 101
"Disney Girls"
"The Way I Want to Touch You"

"Don't Call It Love"
AU 7" single (1982)  Wizard ZS-821
"Don't Call It Love"
"Come to Me"

"Saving Up Christmas"
US CD single (2005)  R2 Entertainment

"I Want a Hippopotamus for Christmas"

"It's the Most Wonderful Time of the Year"

Discographies of American artists
Pop music group discographies